John Bannon (1829–1913), was an Irish Catholic Jesuit priest who  served as a Confederate chaplain during the American Civil war. He was renowned as an orator.

Early life 
John Bannon was born 29 December 1829 at Rooskey, County Roscommon, and was raised there. His father also called James Bannon was a Dublin grain dealer, and Fanny Bannon (née O'Farrell). He went to the vincentian Castleknock College in Dublin. In 1846 he went to study for the priesthood at St Patrick's College, Maynooth in the minor seminary until 1850, completed his theology course in 1853, and was ordained on 16 June 1853 by Archbishop Paul Cullen of the Archdiocese of Dublin. He soon applied to move to America.

In America 
Shortly after ordination he moved to the Archdiocese of St Louis, Missouri, USA. He became pastor to St. John the Apostle and Evangelist Church which he built in 1858. He served in the First Missouri Confederate Brigade, during the Civil War.

He ministered at the battles of Corinth, Fort Gibson and at Big Black, Vicksburg.

He was detained on 4 July 1863 when Vicksburg surrendered. After being released by Union forces he went to Richmond in August 1863, where Jefferson Davis and Judah Benjamin (the Confederate Secretary of State) asked him to go to Ireland to discourage recruitment for the Union forces and try to get international help for the Confederacy.

Return to Ireland 
In November 1863 he returned to Ireland, writing and pamphleting to discourage people from emigrating and joining the Union side of the civil war. He wrote in The Nation. He made two trips to Rome to try, unsuccessfully, to get the Vatican to side with the Confederacy. Following the civil war he was banned from preaching in St. Louis, and stayed in Ireland, becoming a Jesuit in 1865, spending some time in Milltown Park, Tullabeg College, and in Gardiner Street.

He died on 14 July 1913 in Upper Gardiner Street, and was buried in the Jesuit plot at Glasnevin Cemetery, Dublin.

References

1829 births
1913 deaths
People from County Roscommon
19th-century Irish Jesuits
People educated at Castleknock College
Alumni of St Patrick's College, Maynooth
Irish expatriates in the United States
Burials at Glasnevin Cemetery
Irish military chaplains
Confederate States Army chaplains
19th-century American clergy